Herochroma elaearia is a moth of the family Geometridae, first described by George Hampson in 1903. It is found in Sikkim, India.

References

Moths described in 1903
Pseudoterpnini
Moths of Asia